Yuthlert Sippapak (born November 8, 1966 in Loei, Thailand) is a Thai film director, screenwriter and producer. He is best known for his genre-blending films Killer Tattoo (comedy and action) and Buppah Rahtree (comedy and horror).

Biography
Growing up in northeast Thailand, Yuthlert developed a strong interest in the arts from an early age and at 18 went to Bangkok to study fine arts at Silpakorn University, where he received a degree in interior design (the same program as another Thai director, Wisit Sasanatieng).

Yuthlert set up his own design company, which he worked at for a year before his interest waned. He then moved to New York City, where he studied at the Art Students League of New York. This put him in touch with a group of friends who were involved in the film business, which made him think that was something he wanted to do.

He returned to Thailand and submitted a script to Tai Entertainment and told them that he wanted to direct a movie. The script and his offer to direct were rejected. He then offered a three-page script called Always Love, and it was rejected.

Yuthlert returned to New York and worked for a time doing architectural drawing while also studying filmmaking on his own and developing his script-writing abilities.

He returned to Thailand and Tai Entertainment, offering a screenplay for O-Negative, which was based on his three-page script. Tai Entertainment offered him a position as the assistant director on the film, but he turned them down and took back his script. He ended up selling the script to GMM Grammy and had the project taken away from him. The film starred Tata Young.

So he wrote another script, which became Killer Tattoo, about a group of aging and/or mentally challenged assassins. He took it to RS Film's Avant Co. Ltd., which allowed him to direct the film and cast an ensemble of Thai comedians, including Suthep Po-ngam and Petchtai Wongkamlao, as the stars.

In 2002, he established Mahagan Films Co. Ltd. as his production company. And in 2003, for his sophomore directorial effort, the drama February, he returned to Grammy's GMM Pictures for a distribution deal.

Genre blending
Since Killer Tattoo, casting comedians in dramatic roles has become a trademark for Yuthlert.

His 2004 film Sai Lor Fah (Pattaya Maniac) featured another top Thai comedian, Choosak Eamsuk (better known as Nong Cha Cha Cha) in the lead dramatic role, with Somchai Kemglad—the heroic lead from Killer Tattoo—as the comedy relief.

His horror films, Buppah Rahtree (containing references and homages to The Exorcist and Audition) and the sequel Buppah Rahtree Phase 2: Rahtree Returns as well as Krasue Valentine all feature heavy doses of comedy, but also have significant dramatic elements.

Not all his films have been comedies. His second film, February was a romance about a Thai woman with a terminal illness who goes to New York City, is hit by a car and then develops amnesia, forgetting that she's in need of medical care.

He's faced controversy over casting Sayan Muangcharoen, a Thai comedian with Down syndrome in his films. However, Sayan is a popular staple in other Thai films and on television comedy variety shows.

Yuthlert often makes in jokes and references to his own films. In Sai Lor Fah, a character is encouraged to be just like "Kit Silencer", the lead character from Killer Tattoo. Also, a character in Sai Lor Fah was trying to buy an unlicensed DVD of Buppah Rahtree 3, a sequel that hasn't been made. In Ghost Variety, a film directed by Adirek Wattaleela (a producing partner and character actor in Yuthlert's films), Yuthlert had a cameo (as did dozens of other Thai filmmakers). The characters in Ghost Variety burst into what they thought was a haunted house, but turned out to be a movie set of Buppah Rahtree 3.

His latest film, 2006's Krasue Valentine contained a number of references to his Buppah Rahtree films, the most visible of which was a bumbling pair of police officers (one portrayed by Adirek Wattaleela) that appeared in both Buppah Rahtree installments.

Future projects
Since Krasue Valentine, Yuthlert has been tied to a number of upcoming projects. One was a horror film, Mia Ngoo (The Snake's Wife), and the other was about a band of disabled martial arts warriors called Kode Mahagan. The latest project mentioned is Ghost Station, a comedy about a pair of gay men that appears to be a parody of Brokeback Mountain.

Filmography
Killer Tattoo (2001)
February (Khumphaphan) (2003)
Buppah Rahtree (Rahtree: Flower of the Night) (2003)
Sai Lor Fah (Pattaya Maniac) (2004)
Buppah Rahtree Phase 2: Rahtree Returns (2005)
Krasue Valentine (Ghost Valentine) (2006)
Ghost Station (2007)
The Last Moment (2008 Film) (2008)
Kill Tim (2008)
Mia Ngoo (in development)
Kode Mahagan (in development)

References
 Director profile, MovieSeer
 Tung, Chi and Tseng, Ada (December 3, 2004). "Yuthlert Sippapak: Not your everyday director", Asia Pacific Arts, UCLA.
 Williamson, Rob. September 2005. "Take it easy chicken: Yuthlert Sippapak interviewed", Firecracker.

Notes

External links
 
 Yuthlert Sippapak at the Thai Film Database

1966 births
Living people
Yuthlert Sippapak
Yuthlert Sippapak
Yuthlert Sippapak
Yuthlert Sippapak